Thomas N. DeVito (born August 7, 1998) is an American football quarterback for the Illinois Fighting Illini.

Early life and high school career
DeVito grew up in Cedar Grove, New Jersey and attended Don Bosco Preparatory High School. He passed for and was named first team All-State by MSG and second team All-Metro after passing for 1,800 yards and 18 touchdowns in his junior season as the Ironmen went 9–3 and won the Non-Public 4 state championship. Following his junior year, DeVito competed in the Elite 11 quarterback competition and was named a finalist. As a senior, he passed for 2,005 yards, 16 touchdowns and five interceptions and played in the Under Armour All-American Game. DeVito committed to play college football at Syracuse at the end of his junior year over offers from Yale, Boston College, Penn, Rutgers, Maryland and Temple.

College career

Syracuse

DeVito redshirted his true freshman season. He served mostly as the backup to starting quarterback Eric Dungey as a redshirt freshman, playing in eight games off the bench and completing 44 of 87 passes for 525 yards and four touchdowns. DeVito's first significant action came on September 15, 2018, against Florida State, entering the game after Dungey suffered an injury and completing 11 of 16 passes for 144 yards and a touchdown while also rushing for a touchdown as the Orange won 30–7. DeVito again played in relief of an injured Dungey on October 10 against North Carolina, and he led Syracuse to a 40–37 win in double overtime, throwing for 181 yards with three touchdowns and one interception on 11-for-19 passing. As a redshirt sophomore, DeVito passed for 2,360 yards and 19 touchdowns and rushed for 122 yards and two touchdowns. He passed for a career-high 330 yards, three touchdowns and an interception in a 63–20 loss to Maryland. 

In 2020, DeVito completed 48-of-96 pass attempts for 593 yards and four touchdowns through the first four games of the season before suffering a season-ending leg injury against Duke. He began his redshirt senior season as Syracuse's starter, but was ultimately replaced by transfer Garrett Shrader. Six weeks into the season, DeVito entered the NCAA transfer portal.

Illinois
DeVito ultimately transferred to Illinois. He was named the Fighting Illini's starting quarterback during fall practices. On October 1, against Wisconsin, DeVito had three rushing touchdowns in the 34–10 victory. In the 2022 season, DeVito passed for 2,650 yards, 15 touchdowns, and four interceptions to go along with six rushing touchdowns.

Statistics

References

External links
Syracuse Orange bio
Illinois Fighting Illini bio

1998 births
Living people
American football quarterbacks
Don Bosco Preparatory High School alumni
People from Cedar Grove, New Jersey
Players of American football from New Jersey
Sportspeople from Essex County, New Jersey
Syracuse Orange football players
Illinois Fighting Illini football players